Lockwood is an unincorporated community in western Nicholas County, West Virginia, United States. The town is situated along Otter Creek and West Virginia Route 39.

History
The community is named in honor of Belva Ann Lockwood, a presidential candidate and early feminist.

Lockwood post office was established in 1893.

The Lockwood Historic District was listed on the National Register of Historic Places in 1998.

Notable person
John W. Shelton, businessman and member of the West Virginia House of Delegates, was born in Lockwood.

See also
Belva, West Virginia, another community in Nicholas County named for Lockwood.

References

Unincorporated communities in Nicholas County, West Virginia
Unincorporated communities in West Virginia